Cork Player's Strike may refer to the following:

 2002 Cork players' strike
 2007–8 Cork players' strike